IQC may refer to:

 Institute for Quantum Computing, University of Waterloo, Waterloo, Ontario, Canada
 Instituto Questão de Ciência, a Brazilian non-profit organisation
 Itaquaquecetuba (CPTM) (station code: IQC), a train station in Itaquaquecetuba, São Paulo, Brazil

See also
 IQCE, IQ domain-containing protein E